The Electoral district of Lyell was a single-member electoral district of the Tasmanian House of Assembly. It included the towns of Queenstown and Strahan in the West Coast region of Tasmania.

The seat was created in a redistribution in 1899, and was abolished when the Tasmanian parliament adopted the Hare-Clark electoral model in 1909. It was first filled at a by-election on 10 April 1899, notable for being the first occasion on which the Labor Party contested a Tasmanian seat. Its candidate, R. Matthews, gained 40% of the votes

In 1903, Labor's James Long won the seat. At the 1909 election he successfully transferred to the multi-member seat of Darwin (now known as Braddon), but resigned the following year to successfully contest an Australian Senate seat.

Members for Lyell

Notes

References
 
 
 Parliament of Tasmania (2006). The Parliament of Tasmania from 1956

Lyell
Western Tasmania